Germany–Slovenia relations are the foreign relations between Germany and Slovenia. Germany–Slovenia state relations are good and harmonious. Both countries established diplomatic relations on 15 January 1992. Germany has an embassy in Ljubljana. Slovenia has an embassy in Berlin and a general consulate in Munich. Both countries are full members of NATO and the European Union. There are more than 50,000 Slovenes living in Germany and more than 50,000 Germans living in Slovenia. During the first years of Slovenian independence, Germany was a strong advocate for the self-determination of Slovenes, and instituted a comprehensive consulting and support program for the promotion of democratization and market reform process in Slovenia. It also supported Slovenian accession to the EU and NATO.

A number of high-level visits have strengthened the friendly relations, e.g. Chancellor Gerhard Schröder visited Ljubljana on 26 June 2001, on the occasion of the 10th anniversary of Slovenian independence; from 25 until 27 March 2003, Wolfgang Thierse, the Bundestag President,  visited Ljubljana, Celje and Koper, and Federal President Johannes Rau was in advance of the meeting of the Central and Eastern European Presidents from 29 May until 1 June 2002 in Bled, Ljubljana and Maribor. Since Slovenian accession to the NATO and the EU in spring 2004, the partnership of the two countries has reached a new level. More highlights of these two nations diplomatic relations include the visit of the CSU group in the German Bundestag with the Federal Economics Minister Glos and Federal Agriculture Minister Seehofer on 11 July 2006 in Ljubljana and the participation of Chancellor Angela Merkel at the official ceremony of the Slovenian government to adopt the euro on 15 January 2007 in the Slovenian capital.

Diplomatic missions

Republic of Germany
Ljubljana (Embassy)

Republic of Slovenia
Berlin (Embassy) 
Munich (Consulate–General)

See also 
 Foreign relations of Germany
 Foreign relations of Slovenia
 Germany–Yugoslavia relations
 Accession of Slovenia to the European Union

External links 

 German Federal Foreign Office about relations with Slovenia
  German embassy in Ljubljana (in German and Slovenian only) 
 German and Slovenian only) 

 
Slovenia
Bilateral relations of Slovenia